Andreas Heumann (born 1946 in Munich) is a photographer and painter.

Heumann was raised in Switzerland, after leaving school, he began a four-year apprenticeship in Bern to study block-making and printing. He began his career in photography in London via short stints in Paris and New York. Photographers like Alfred Stieglitz, Avedon, André Kertész, Weston, Edward Steichen and Henri Cartier-Bresson influenced his early work.

Once in London, he started to do reportage and fashion photography working on assignments for magazines such as Stern, Vogue, Twen, Harper's Magazine and many others. Since then he has worked on over twelve hundred advertising campaigns, both national and international.

Heumann said during an interview in Techniques of Masters: "A bad picture will always be a bad picture, no technique will save or improve it. It is not style or technique that makes the image. It is the thought and the interpretation of an experience in life, our seven senses, which have to be translated into a picture. The technique is only a tool for enhancement of a thought".

Awards 
 Medaille d'argent, Voluntary Fire Brigade of Niederwunsen, SE Germany 2017
 Accepted by the Royal Academy of Arts 2007
 The Association of Photographers (UK): a record number of 6 Gold Awards, 6 Silver Awards, 15 Merit Awards and 3 Judges Choice Awards from the beginning the Awards have been running up to 2006. In 1990 he was honored to be a judge - no work entered.

 Prize winner of the Cannes Advertising Festival 98 - Gold & Silver Awards
 Prize winner of the John Kobal Portrait Awards 95
 Golden Cardboard Git Award of Arts 1996 
 Communications Arts - Award of Excellence 94
 The New York Art Directors Club 94 - Merit Award
 Agfa Picture of the Year 94
 Art Director Club Italy 1993 (Gold for best Advertising picture)
 World Image Awards (USA) 1992 - Winner of Fine Art Photography Category
 Campaign Press Awards 1991 (UK) - 1 Gold Award, 5 Silver Awards
 Art Director's Club of France 1990 - Silver Award
 Art Director's Club of Switzerland 1990 - Silver Award
 Art Director's Club of New York 1988 - Gold Award
 Frankfurt Book Fair 1979 - (Germany) Golden Letter Award for best 50 Books of the year.

Publications 
Augenblick (Ger. n.) - a moment of time; a blink. 

This book is partly autobiographical; and the photographs are very much part of his own experiences, his creative thoughts and the continuing and penetrating interpretations of his own life. Whilst photography for Andreas is a never ending obsession he has always been interested in painting and took up this medium in 1999. Clearly influenced by Modigliani and Picasso, his expressive use of color creates work that has been bought by collectors worldwide.

Exhibitions 
 8–11 June 2007 - Hackwood Art Festival
 8–13 October 2007 - Solo Exhibition, The Gallery, Cork Street, London W1  (Photographs and Paintings).

External links 
 
 Arden and Anstruther
 Lens Modern
 The International Analogue Photographic Society
 Saatchi gallery

References 

1946 births
Living people
Fashion photographers